Annals of the Empire (Annales de l’Empire) is a history of Germany written by the French philosopher and author Voltaire at the request of Princess Luise Dorothea of Saxe-Meiningen in 1753. The first volume appeared in December 1753 and the second in March 1754.

It is largely compiled from previous work by German historians: Voltaire described his role as like an architect, assembling a building from individual pieces of masonry.

Quotation
The Annals are the source of Voltaire's much-quoted statement about the Holy Roman Empire:
This agglomeration which was called, and which still calls itself the Holy Roman Empire is in no respect either holy, Roman or an empire.

References

External links

Works by Voltaire
1753 books
History books about Germany
18th-century history books